Woodville, New York may refer to: 

Woodhaven, Queens, New York, (variant name: Woodville)
Woodville, Jefferson County, New York
Woodville, Ontario County, New York